The 2001 Cracker Barrel Old Country Store 500 was the fourth stock car race of the 2001 NASCAR Winston Cup Series. It was held on March 11, 2001 at Atlanta Motor Speedway, in Hampton, Georgia. The 325-lap race was won by Kevin Harvick of the Richard Childress Racing team after starting from fifth position. Jeff Gordon finished second and his Hendrick Motorsports teammate Jerry Nadeau came in third.

This race and 6 other races was supposed to be Kevin Harvick's Cup debut for the #30 America Online Chevy.

Pole position driver Dale Jarrett maintained his lead for the first six laps of the race, but Harvick, who started fifth, passed him on the seventh lap. Gordon soon became the leader and would lead the race high of 118 laps. Five laps from the finish, Harvick took the lead after a five-car battle. On the final lap, Harvick won his first Winston Cup Series race from Gordon by .006 seconds in his third start.

There were 8 cautions and 25 lead changes among 11 different drivers. The result left Gordon in first position of the Drivers' Championship, thirty-seven ahead of second place driver Sterling Marlin and seventy-three ahead of Johnny Benson. Chevrolet maintained its lead in the Manufacturers' Championship, fourteen points ahead of Ford and twenty ahead of Pontiac, with thirty-two races remaining in the season.

Report

Background
The track, Atlanta Motor Speedway is one of three quad-oval tracks to hold NASCAR races, the others being Charlotte Motor Speedway and Texas Motor Speedway. The track's turns are banked at twenty-four degrees, while the straightaways are banked at five degrees. Atlanta Motor Speedway can seat up to 99,000 people.

Before the race, Sterling Marlin was leading the Drivers' Championship with 468 points, and Jeff Gordon stood in second with 433 points. Michael Waltrip was third in the Drivers' Championship with 415 points, Dale Jarrett was fourth with 411 points, and Steve Park was fifth with 401 points. In the Manufacturers' Championship, Chevrolet were leading with 27 points, nine points ahead of their rival Ford. Pontiac, with 12 points, were two points ahead of Dodge in the battle for third. Dale Earnhardt was the race's defending champion.

Practice and qualifying
Two practice sessions were held before the Sunday race—one on Friday, and one on Saturday. The first session lasted 120 minutes, and the second 60 minutes. During the first practice session, Jarrett was fastest, placing ahead of Jimmy Spencer in second and Gordon in third. Kevin Harvick was scored fourth, and Brett Bodine placed fifth.

During Friday afternoon qualifying, forty-six cars were entered, but only forty-three were able to race because of NASCAR's qualifying procedure. Dale Jarrett clinched his second consecutive pole position of 2001 with a time of 28.763 seconds. He was joined on the front row by Jeff Gordon, Todd Bodine and Mark Martin shared the second row in the third and fourth position, while Kevin Harvick, with a time of 28.908, qualified fifth. Jeremy Mayfield, Dave Blaney, Jimmy Spencer, Rusty Wallace and Michael Waltrip rounded out the top ten qualifiers. The three drivers that failed to qualify were Rick Mast, Carl Long and Casey Atwood.

Race
The race, the fourth out of a total of thirty-six in the season, began at 1 p.m. EST and was televised live in the United States on FOX. To begin pre-race ceremonies, at 1 p.m EST, Phil Brannon, the Atlanta Motor Speedway Chaplain, gave the invocation. Then, Moby in the Morning, from local radio station WKHX-FM performed the national anthem, and television personality Willard Scott gave the command for drivers to start their engines.

Dale Jarrett made a good start, retaining the first position; Jeff Gordon behind him maintained second position. At the end of the first lap, Kevin Harvick passed Gordon. By lap 3, Jerry Nadeau was clipped by Michael Waltrip with Robert Pressley spinning out and nearly being clipped by Nadeau. During the same lap, the grandstands fell silent and spectators held up a three-finger salute in the memory of Dale Earnhardt—who was killed in an accident during the Daytona 500 three weeks previously; and 7,000 balloons were released into the air.

The heartbreak of the day was for Dave Blaney. Blaney, driving Bill Davis Racing's #93 Dodge, dominated the middle of the race, leading 70 laps. Blaney was about to make a pit stop with less than 90 laps to go, when a caution came out. Blaney chose to not pit and lead to the caution flag to protect his lead. Two laps later, the wheel came flying off, costing him his first Winston Cup win. Once Blaney was out of the race, this would set up the final shootout between 5 cars with those being Jerry Nadeau, Dale Jarrett, Kevin Harvick, Dale Earnhardt Jr., and Jeff Gordon. With 5 to go, Harvick passed Nadeau and Jarrett to take the lead. With 3 to go, Dale Earnhardt Jr. came down pit road with a flat tire ending his chances of winning. At the same time, Jeff Gordon passed his teammate Jerry Nadeau for second setting up a dramatic final lap between Harvick and Gordon.

On the final lap (325), Gordon attempted a pass on Harvick the straightway but Harvick won his first Winston Cup Series race by .006 seconds, the second closest finish in a NASCAR-sanctioned race. Nadeau followed in third, ahead of Jarrett in fourth and Terry Labonte in fifth.

Post-race
Kevin Harvick appeared in victory lane after his victory lap to start celebrating his first win in the Winston Cup Series. Harvick's victory took place in his third start, breaking the record of the fewest starts to first victory previously held by Dale Earnhardt Jr.

Results

Qualifying

Race

References

Cracker Barrel Old Country Store
Cracker Barrel Old Country Store
NASCAR races at Atlanta Motor Speedway